This is a list of seasons played by Derbyshire County Cricket Club in English cricket, from the club's formation in 1870.

Early years 1871–1887

Derbyshire played their first matches in 1871. For the first three years their only opponents were Lancashire. When Kent joined in 1874, by a quirk of scoring which was based on games lost, they were County Champion. The club was bedevilled by financial problems, and in 1888 the sporting press decided no longer to accord them first class status.

Wilderness years 1888–1893

From 1888 Derbyshire's matches were not accorded first class status. However the club continued to play first class counties and most of the players carried on with the club. In 1891 the County Championship was established and four years later Derbyshire were invited to join.

First Class and County Championships 1894–1962

In 1894 Derbyshire's matches were accorded first class status. However the club did not compete in the County Championship until the following year when it sealed its place by coming 5th.

New Competitions 1963–1998

In the 1960s, to revitalise the game, various competitions were introduced and Derbyshire participated in these. The Gillette Cup – later The National Westminster Bank Trophy – began in 1963 as a Knock Out (KO) competition, The John Player League – later The National League began in 1969 as a one-day competition. The Benson & Hedges Cup competition began in 1972 as a Limited Over (LO)knock out competition with preliminary groups.

Divisions 1999 – 2009 

In 1999 the National League was split into two divisions, followed by the County Championship in 2000. The National Westminster Bank Trophy became the Cheltenham and Gloucester Trophy and then The Friends Provident Trophy. The League had various appellations until it became the National League. The Benson & Hedges Competition was dropped in 2002 and the Twenty20 competition substituted in 2003.

Three competitions 2010 onwards 

Two new competitions were introduced for the 2010 cricket season. These were the Clydesdale Bank 40 and the Friends Provident t20. These replaced the Pro40 League, the Friends Provident Trophy and the Twenty20 competitions.

Key

Key to league record:
P – games played
W – games won
L – games lost
D – games drawn, abandoned or tied
NR – games with no result
Pos – final position

Key to rounds:
R1 – first round
R2 – second round, etc.
QF – quarter-final
SF – semi-final
Grp – group stage
RU – runners-up

See also
Durham County Cricket Club seasons
Kent County Cricket Club seasons
Northamptonshire County Cricket Club seasons
Somerset County Cricket Club seasons

References

Cricket Archive

Seasons, Derbyshire
Derbyshire Cricket Club